William Hadley may refer to:

 William A. Hadley (1860–1941), founder of Hadley school for the blind, Illinois, USA
 William F. L. Hadley (1847–1901), American congressman
 William M. Hadley (1917–1992), American educator
 Bill Hadley (rugby union) (1910–1992), New Zealand rugby union player
 William Sheldon Hadley (1859–1927), British academic